Baal Krishna  is an Indian Hindi Mythological  television series which premiered on 14 March 2016 and was broadcast on BIG Magic. The series was produced by Swastik Pictures of Siddarth Kumar Tewarey.

The series explored lesser known stories and also dealt with widely popular stories about Lord Krishna.

Cast
 Bhavesh Balchandani as and in Krishna
 Meet Mukhi as Child Krishna
 Jaival Pathak as Little Krishna
 Gracy Goswami as Radha
 Deshna Dugad as Little Radha
 Harsh Mehta as Balram
 Eklavya Ahir as Child Balram
 Suman Gupta as Yashoda
 Nimai Bali as Kans
 Sachin Shroff as Krishna / Vishnu
 Amisha Shrivastava as Shachi
  as Vasudeva
  as Devaki
 Praneet Bhat /  Ajay Mishra as  Nanda
Sangeeta Khanayat as Rukmini
 Saar Kashyap as Arunasur
 Ram Awana as Ravan
 Riyanka Chanda as Kirtida
 Ayaan Khan
 Aishwarya Sharma Bhatt as Putana

References

External links
 

2016 Indian television series debuts
Hindi-language television shows
Big Magic original programming
2017 Indian television series endings
Television series based on Mahabharata
Krishna in popular culture
Swastik Productions television series